Sumner Henry Needham (born March 2, 1828 - died April 19, 1861) is regarded by some as the first Union casualty of the American Civil War, although he was killed by civilians of the United States. He was killed in the Baltimore riot of 1861 as the troops passed through that city.

References

1861 deaths
Union military personnel killed in the American Civil War
People of Massachusetts in the American Civil War
American Christian universalists
19th-century Christian universalists
1828 births